OC Bus is the transit bus service operated by the Orange County Transportation Authority (OCTA), serving every city in Orange County. Some of the lines serve the Los Angeles County border communities of Lakewood, La Mirada, Cerritos, Hawaiian Gardens, and Long Beach. As of February 2023, there are 52 routes in the system. OCTA employs the drivers that operate most routes, but some are contracted out to First Transit.

The agency is the second-largest public transportation provider in the metropolitan area after the Los Angeles County Metropolitan Transportation Authority. Its predecessor agencies include not only the prior Orange County Transit District but also such diverse entities as the Pacific Electric Railway and the South Coast Transit Corporation. In 2005, OCTA was judged America's Best Public Transportation System by the American Public Transportation Association, for its record gains in bus and Metrolink commuter trains ridership that it operates or funds.

The Authority's administrative offices are located in the city of Orange and it maintains bus operations bases in the cities of Garden Grove, and Santa Ana. First Transit operates about 40% of OCTA's Fixed Routes out of the Anaheim and Irvine bases, while MV Transportation operates OCTA's paratransit base for the authority's ACCESS service, also in Irvine.

All OCTA buses are equipped with bike racks and can carry two bikes, and three bicycles on some buses at any time.

South Coast Plaza is the most served location on the OC Bus routes, served by 5 routes (55, 57, 86, 150, 553). The longest is route 1 (Long Beach–San Clemente) which utilizes Pacific Coast Highway for the vast majority of its  route. Trips take an average of 2 to 2.5 hours.

Routes

1-99 (Local Routes)
Routes with numbers less than 100 are fixed routes that cover almost every city in Orange County. Buses operate on most major arterial streets. Route 1 is the only single-digit route, acquiring the number from California State Route 1.

100s (Community Routes)
Routes with numbers in the 100s descended from the old RunAbout service that formerly served residential neighborhoods, or provide service to portions of 1-99 routes that have reduced demand. Three routes (129, 143, 153) were truncated from routes 29, 43, 47, 53, and 59 as a result of March 2010 service change. These routes are operated by First Transit with the exception of routes 123, 150, and 167 which were taken over by OCTA 2022.

400s (StationLink/iShuttle)  

Routes with numbers in the 400s are "StationLink" and Irvine Shuttle (iShuttle) routes which travel between Metrolink stations and business districts. These routes operate only during weekday rush hours and do not operate reverse peak services. These routes are operated by First Transit.

500s (Bravo!) 

Routes with numbers in the 500s are "Bravo!" routes that operate on heavily used routes making limited stops and at transfer points to other routes. It is named according to the parent route it accompanies, for adding a 5 to the beginning of the route indicating express. Bravo! routes use a dedicated fleet of buses and have different color schemes from regular route buses.

800s (City Shuttle)
Routes with numbers in the 800s are City Shuttle routes. Route 862, the first and only 800 series route, serving as a circulator route in Downtown Santa Ana and was introduced in October 2019, replacing former StationLink route 462.

Active Fleet

See also

References

External links

Bus
Orange County California bus routes
Orange County California